Michele Besaggio (born 28 April 2002) is an Italian professional footballer who plays as a midfielder for  club Juventus Next Gen, on loan from Genoa.

Career

Youth career 
Besaggio started playing football in 2006, aged four, when he joined a local grassroots club in Merlara. He then played for Urbana, before entering Vicenza's youth sector at the age of 14. He spent two years with the Biancorossi, before being released and subsequently signed by Genoa in August 2018.

Having impressed in his performances for the under-17 team in his first months at the club, Besaggio was then promoted to the under-19 side, as he featured for them in the Torneo di Viareggio in March 2019. The midfielder spent three more seasons with Genoa's Primavera team (which he also captained), without making a single official appearance for the senior squad.

Juventus Next Gen 
On 25 August 2022, Besaggio joined Serie A club Juventus on a year-long loan, with an option to make the deal permanent, and was promptly assigned to their reserve team.

On 3 September, he made his professional debut, coming on as a substitute for Samuel Iling-Junior in the Serie C match against Trento, which ended in a 2-0 win for his side. He then scored his first professional goal on 2 October, netting a penalty kick in the 1-1 league draw against Pergolettese.

Style of play 
Besaggio has been described as a well-rounded, right-footed midfielder, who can either play as a number 10 or a mezzala. He has been mainly regarded for his technical abilities, his strength, his work rate and his leadership skills.

He has cited Alessandro Del Piero, Philippe Coutinho and Goran Pandev as his biggest sources of inspiration.

Personal life 
Besaggio is a self-declared supporter of Juventus.

Career statistics

References

External links 

 
 

Living people
2002 births
L.R. Vicenza players
Genoa C.F.C. players
Juventus Next Gen players
Italian footballers
Association football midfielders